Jayanul Rain is a Nepalese politician. He is a member of Provincial Assembly of Madhesh Province from Loktantrik Samajwadi Party, Nepal. Rain, a resident of Balawa Municipality, was elected via 2017 Nepalese provincial elections from Mahottari 2(A).

Electoral history

2017 Nepalese provincial elections

References

Living people
1966 births
Madhesi people
Nepalese Muslims
21st-century Nepalese politicians
Members of the Provincial Assembly of Madhesh Province
Loktantrik Samajwadi Party, Nepal politicians